Aniline is an organic compound with the formula .
Aniline (data page)

Aniline may also refer to:
Mauveine (also known as aniline dye), the first synthetic organic dye
Aniline leather, leather treated with aniline as a dye
Aniline Yellow, a yellow azo dye and an aromatic amine
Aniline Blue WS, a mixture of methyl blue and water blue
Aniline point, the temperature at which equal volumes of aniline and diesel oil are completely miscible

See also
 ANLN or anillin, a protein